The Lost Bridge was a bridge that was built over the Little Missouri River in 1930,  north of Killdeer, North Dakota, on North Dakota Highway 22. A road to the bridge was finally built 20 years later, hence the name. The Lost Bridge was dismantled in 1994. A plaque and a piece of the old bridge have been installed on Route 22 near the new bridge as a memorial.

See also
List of bridges documented by the Historic American Engineering Record in North Dakota

References
City of Killdeer: Places of Interest

External links

Road bridges in North Dakota
Demolished bridges in the United States
Historic American Engineering Record in North Dakota
Bridges completed in 1930
Buildings and structures in Dunn County, North Dakota
Little Missouri River (North Dakota)